Aq Bolagh-e Pain may refer to:
 Aq Bolagh-e Pain, Ardabil
 Aq Bolagh-e Pain, East Azerbaijan
 Aq Bolagh-e Pain, Zanjan

See also
 Agh Bolagh-e Pain